Deer View is an area within the Eldorado National Forest in El Dorado County, California.

References

Eldorado National Forest
Unincorporated communities in El Dorado County, California
Unincorporated communities in California